Metin Tuğlu (born 10 September 1984) is a Turkish professional footballer who plays as a left back for Bandırmaspor.

References

1984 births
People from Sinop, Turkey
Living people
Turkish footballers
Süper Lig players
Tepecikspor footballers
Kırşehirspor footballers
Ankara Keçiörengücü S.K. footballers
Darıca Gençlerbirliği footballers
Akçaabat Sebatspor footballers
Gaziantepspor footballers
Adanaspor footballers
Adana Demirspor footballers
Kayseri Erciyesspor footballers
Bandırmaspor footballers
Association football defenders